The Correspondence between the Ottoman sultan and the Cossacks, also variously known as the Correspondence between the Cossacks and the Ottoman/Turkish sultan, is a collection of apocryphal letters claiming to be between a sultan of the Ottoman Empire (usually identified as Mehmed IV) and a group of Cossacks, originally associated with the city of Chyhyryn, Ukraine, but later with Zaporizhzhia, Ukraine.

According to traditional interpretations, the sultan's letter and the Cossack response (also known as the Zaporozhian/Cossack letter to the Turkish sultan; Ukrainian: Лист запорожців турецькому султанові) were written between 1672 and 1680. The sultan supposedly demanded the Cossacks to surrender by boasting about his titles and power, and the Cossacks, allegedly commanded by a man named Ivan Sirko (or "Zaxarcenko") sent an insulting sarcastic reply in which they vowed to fight against the sultan.

Although early commentators were in doubt whether the apocryphal letters were possibly authentic, modern scholars have known since the 1970s that the supposed "correspondence" is a literary forgery, that is to be understood within a large body of similar writings of early modern European Christian anti-Ottoman propaganda which emerged during the Ottoman wars in Europe. It is not certain whether the original text was written in Middle Polish or (less likely) Middle Ukrainian, but the Russian ("Muscovite") versions are almost certainly translations of a non-Russian original. It's also possible that the Polish original was first translated into Russian, and later into Ukrainian.

History

Examination 

One of the first people who attempted to critically study the correspondence between the sultan and Cossacks was Andrej Popov (1869). He correctly linked it to a group of other apocryphal letters attributed to the sultan that appear in 17th-century Muscovite manuscripts, but he incorrectly concluded that all of these letters had to have been written by the same Muscovite author in the last quarter of the 17th century. Subsequent studies attempted to show that the original text of the sultan–Cossack correspondence was written in Polish, and then translated into Ukrainian and Russian, or that Ukrainian was the primary version. Kostiantyn V. Kharlampovych / Xarlampovyč (1923) did the first thorough textological analysis of several versions available to him, which he divided into two groups: short Russian versions (known to Popov) which connected the Cossacks to Chyhyryn, and longer Ukrainian versions (collectively called the "Ukrainian redaction") which connected the Cossacks to Zaporizhzhia and contained various other elements not found in the short Russian versions. Although Kharlampovych did not have access to any Polish versions, the internal evidence convinced him that Polish had to have been the original language, and that factual discrepancies in the Ukrainian texts made it extremely implausible that they had originated from the 17th-century Cossacks in Ukraine.

With her two 1950s articles, Marianna Davidovna Kagan-Tarkovskaia was the first scholar to thoroughly examine many Russian texts, concluding they were most likely translated from Ukrainian to Russian by the Posolskii prikaz (Muscovite Ambassadorial/Diplomatic Chancery), which was in charge of translating foreign pamphlets and newspapers.  Nud'ha (1963) brought a so-far unknown Polish text to light and argued for an early-17th-century Ukrainian origin of the correspondence, but his conclusions were found to be untenable. In 1966, Eustachiewicz and Inglot published a number of Polish versions of the sultan–Cossack letters, which – with one exception – corresponded to the "Ukrainian redaction", and cited a significant amount of evidence to connect it to a well-established 17th-century literary tradition in Poland.

Observations and conclusions 

U.S.-based Slavic and Eastern European historian Daniel C. Waugh (1978) observed: 

According to Ukrainian historian Volodymyr Pylypenko (2019), the letter is 'perhaps the most famous forgery in Ukrainian history, a fake with a long and vibrant history (...). The text has undergone numerous translations and rewritings.' A French and a German translation became the best-known versions, as these made the text accessible to a large European readership. Pylypenko pointed out that the letter bears many stylistic similarities to other fake documents and forgeries that appeared in the 17th century, including the Polish-Lithuanian Commonwealth and the Tsardom of Russia (Muscovy), which purported to be genuine correspondence between various Eastern European Christian monarchs and the Ottoman sultan, but were in fact works of political-religious propaganda. He summarised this genre as follows:
 'the Sultan's letters to the King of Rzeczpospolita [= the Polish-Lithuanian Commonwealth];
 fake correspondence between the monarchs;
 the Sultan's letters to the Polish gentry; and
 a set of false agreements related to the creation of a European Christian anti-Turkish coalition.'

Russian historian Ivan Poliakov (2018) published the oldest known copy of the sultan–Cossack correspondence as found in a Romodanovsky archive from the 1670s, which is very important for understanding how these texts came into existence. According to Russian historian Stepan Mikhailovich Shamin (2020), the evidence indicates that the text began as a simple joke in the form of a pamphlet by Polish nobles, in which the Chyhyryn Cossacks rebuffed the sultan's titles and threats with humour; Grigory Romodanovsky found this text interesting and funny, had it translated into Russian and then gave it to his nephew S. V. Romodanovsky. Shamin stated that the originally Polish text thus probably found its way through the Romodanovsky family into the Russian language and into the Russian/Muscovite realm. By the late 17th and early 18th century, the pamphlet reappeared in a somewhat modified version every time a new war broke out with the Ottomans, and from the 18th century (especially the mid-18th century) onwards, there are also many Ukrainian versions of the sultan–Cossack correspondence showing up. The fact that the city of Chyhyryn (capital of the Cossack Hetmanate 1648–1676) was destroyed in the 1670s war, and its defence against Ottoman expansion faded from memory with the passage of time, is probably the reason why the "Chyhyryn Cossacks" were eventually replaced by the "Zaphorozhian Cossacks" (much better-known in later times) in most 18th-century versions of the text.

Ukrainian historian Taras Chuhlib (2020) outlined two main reasons for considering all known versions of the sultan–correspondence as literary inventions rather than authentic historical documents: 
 The original text has not been found, but the numerous versions that have survived all contradict each other:
 The letters are dated to different years, including 1600, 1619, 1620, 1667, 1672, 1677, 1683, et cetera.
 The signature below the Cossack letter differs widely, including "grassroots Cossacks", "Otaman Zakharchenko", and "Ivan Sirko".
 The recipients of the Cossack letter differ widely in identifying which Ottoman sultan they are replying to, including "Osman", "Mehmed IV", "Ahmed III", and so on.
 The Ottoman sultan addresses the Cossacks in numerous different ways, including identifying them with either Chyhyryn or Zaporizhzhia.
 The style of the Cossack letter is not credibly historic: 'In fact, it is known about the diplomatic correspondence of Cossack rulers with the rulers of other countries, including the Turkish sultan,' that it had 'a completely different character and never violated the etiquette of the time to address a person of this level.'

Versions

Romodanovsky 1670s (published Poliakov 2018) 

In 2018, Ivan Anatol'evich Poliakov published a detailed examination of what might be the oldest extant copy of a correspondence between the Chyhyryn Cossacks and the Ottoman sultan. The copy was found amongst a collection of writings in the archives of the Rurikid prince S. V. Romodanovsky. Poliakov noted that he was not the first to discover this copy, as Marianna D. Kagan had already referred to it in 1992, but she did not analyse it at the time. Although the latest date in the collection is 25 August 1678, Poliakov found the most probable date of composition for the sultan–Cossack letters in it to be 1673 due to the historical context of the Polish–Ottoman War (1672–1676). Nevertheless, as many other scholars had pointed out earlier, the text bore countless similarities to earlier such anti-Turkish pamphlets published in Polish, German, Dutch and other European languages in more than a century earlier, traceable as far back as 1518. These pamphlets were frequently published when a new war between a European Christian state and the Ottoman Empire had broken out; some details were changed, updated or added to apply to the new situation, and then the pamphlet was spread over Europe and translated into other languages. As for the sultan–Cossack correspondence, the evidence supported a Polish original, which Poliakov suggested may have been inspired by – and written shortly after – the Cossack conquest of the Ottoman Azov Fortress in 1637.

Vienna 1683 (German and Polish) 

In 2019, Ukrainian historian Taras Chuhlib found a Polish version of the sultan–Cossack correspondence in the library of the Polish Academy of Arts and Sciences in Kraków, dated to 24 August 1683. In a 2020 paper, Chuhlib compared this Polish version to two already-known German versions also dated to 1683 (one published by Waugh 1971, both published by Hryhoriy Nudha 1990), all three of which seem to have been written in September–December 1683 in the aftermath of the Battle of Vienna, in order to glorify John III Sobieski, under whose overall command the Christian coalition had defeated the Ottomans at Vienna. The German versions were both titled Copia des Türkischen Kaysers Brief an die Cosacken nach Czechrin ("Copy of the Turkish Emperor's Letter to the Cossacks to Chyhyryn"), with one adding und darauf der Cosacken Antwort ("and the Cossack Answer to it"), while the Polish version was signed with Kozaki Zaporozcy y całey [?] Ukrainy ("Cossacks of Zaporozhya and all of Ukraine"). Waugh (1971) noted that one of the 1683 German versions was derived from a Slavic original, given loanwords such as Bojar, Sobaka ("dog") and Kolbake ("sausage"), and the typo Engel ("angel") rather than Engle ("grandson"), which corresponds to vnuk in Slavic versions. Chuhlib suggested that Jerzy Franciszek Kulczycki may have been involved with the pamphlets' translation to German. 

The 1683 German version(s) feature a significantly longer ending to the Cossack reply, (italicized below) wherein it is argued that John III Sobieski (without naming him explicitly) is not a paholk / Kerl ("boy"), but a far mightier king than the Turkish sultan – a section evidently inserted by a pro-Polish editor:

Chronograph of 1696 (published Popov 1869) 

The text published by Andrej Popov in his book Изборник славянских и русских сочинений и статей ("Collection of Slavic and Russian Works and Articles", 1869, p. 455–456) is in Russian. Popov found this copy in the Chronograph of 1696. In this version, which is shorter than many Ukrainian ones, the Cossacks are connected to the city of Chyhyryn (Ukrainian: Чигири́н; Russian: Чигирин Chigirin):

Kostomarov 1872 

In 1978, American Slavic linguist Victor Friedman gave a detailed analysis of the historical and linguistic background of two versions available to him: the Yavornytsky (Evarnickij) 1894 version in Middle Ukrainian with standardised Russian orthography and containing only one taboo word, and the 1872 Kostomarov version in Middle Ukrainian with a Ukrainian type orthography and containing four 'scatological' taboo words. Because the latter was more archaic in style, Friedman concluded it was probably closer to the original, and thus took the 1872 Kostomarov version as the basis for his English translation and further analysis.

Dunavec 1882 (published Krauss 1880s) 
Friedman (1978) found another version of the two letters in volume 5 of Krypta¡dia (edited and published by Friedrich Salomon Krauss in Heilbronn and Paris between 1883 and 1905), 'where it is said to have been collected in Nižnij Dunavec, Dobrudža, in 1882' (probably modern Dunavets / Дунавец in Tutrakan Municipality in Southern Dobruja, Bulgaria); French translations alongside both letters were also provided. Both the sultan's letter and the Cossack reply are significantly shorter than in the Yavornytsky and Kostomarov versions, and in 'a basically modern, normalized Ukrainian'. Friedman also noted that the phrase mat' tvoju job ("fuck your mother") is an 'insult taken directly from the Russian' (in Ukrainian, it would have been matir tvoju jib), represents 'swearing in the "Muscovite" manner' and 'is the only Russianism in the text'; the phrase is therefore unlikely to be part of the original text, but rather an interpolation. Friedman only translated the Krauss 1882 version of the Zaporozhian reply to English:

Kurylin 1894 (published Yavornytsky 1894) 

For his 1999 English edition of the text, Andrew Gregorovich, a Canadian librarian with Ukrainian roots, based himself on a version of Yavornytsky (also transliterated as Evarnitsky or Evarnickij) and earlier Yavornytsky-based English translations by Cresson (1919), Ripley's Believe It or Not! (1950), and Guerney (1959). The Yavornytsky version, first published in 1894, goes back to a priest called I. Kurylin from the village of Vyshchetarasivka / Вищетарасівка in the Dnipropetrovsk Oblast (then Yekaterinoslav Governorate). Because it contained only one taboo word as opposed to four in the Kostomarov 1872 version, Friedman (1978) assumed that Yavornytsky's version represented an 'expurgated' edition of a more vulgar original.

Gregorovich rendered sultan Mehmed IV's demand and Ivan Sirko's reply as follows:

Other versions 

Ukrainian writer Mykola Arkas included a Ukrainian version of the alleged correspondence between the Ottoman sultan and the Zaporozhian Cossacks in his popular book History of Ukraine–Russia (1912). He commented: 'These letters may be invented, but they are invented very aptly.'

Poet Stepan Rudansky published a Ukrainian poetic edition of the correspondence in Complete Collection of Funny Poems (1915), titled "Ahmet III. and Zaporozhye". Friedman (1978) noted that it was very different in contents and style from the Kostomarov and Yavornytsky versions, and excluded it from consideration.

In popular culture 

The sultan–Cossack correspondence became extremely popular at the start of the Russo-Turkish War (1877–1878). By then, the most popularised versions of the story centred on the Zaporozhian Cossacks (from "beyond the rapids", Ukrainian: za porohamy), inhabiting the lands around the lower Dnieper River in Ukraine, who had supposedly just defeated Ottoman Empire forces in battle some time in the 1670s. However, despite his army having suffered this loss to them, Ottoman sultan Mehmed IV demanded that the Cossacks submit to Ottoman rule. The Cossacks, led by Ivan Sirko, replied in a characteristic manner; they wrote a letter, replete with insults and profanities. The late-19th-century painting by Ilya Repin, Reply of the Zaporozhian Cossacks, exhibits the Cossacks' pleasure at striving to come up with ever more base vulgarities. In the 19th century, the historical Zaporozhian Cossacks were sometimes the subject of  tales demonstrating admiration of their primitive vitality and contemptuous disregard for authority (in marked contrast to the more civilized subjects of the authoritarian Russian state). In 1913, famous french poet Guillaume Apollinaire wrote his own version of the "Reply of the Zaporozhian Cossacks to the Sultan of Constantinople" as an insert in the "Chanson du mal aimé" poem of his Alcools collection. In turn, this french version was adapted in singing as part of Leo Ferré's oratorio La Chanson du Mal-aimé. 

The correspondence and especially Repin's painting of it played an important role in the development of both Ukrainian and Russian nationalism. Every time the Russian Empire and later the Soviet Union faced some kind of strong enemy, the sultan–Cossack letters resurfaced in numerous variants, for example during the "Great Patriotic War" (the Soviet participation in World War II). After the Dissolution of the Soviet Union, the tradition continued along the new states' lines. When the Russo–Turkish conflict in the Syrian civil war began in the 2015, more than a dozen different versions of the Cossack letter to the Turkish sultan appeared on the Internet, including a musical version that gained hundreds of thousands of views; a popularity that would have been unthinkable in the 17th century.

See also 
 Correspondence of Paul and Seneca, a 4th-century collection of apocryphal letters forged in the names of Paul the Apostle and Seneca the Younger
 "NUTS!", reply by U.S. officer Anthony McAuliffe to German commander von Lüttwitz's demand to surrender during the 1944 Siege of Bastogne
 Reply of the Zaporozhian Cossacks, famous late-19th-century painting by Ilya Repin inspired by the alleged correspondence between the Ottoman sultan and the Cossacks
 Russian warship, go fuck yourself, reply by a Ukrainian soldier to a demand to surrender by Russian cruiser Moskva during the 2022 Russian invasion of Ukraine

Notes

References

Bibliography 
 
 
 
 
 
 
 
 

Anti-Ottomanism
Apocryphal epistles
Foreign relations of the Ottoman Empire
Pseudepigraphy
History of the Cossacks in Ukraine